Solar Crisis may refer to:

 Solar Crisis (novel), a 1990 science fiction novel by Takeshi Kawata 
 Solar Crisis (film), a 1990 Japanese-American science fiction film, based on the Japanese novel